Garrett Township is one of nine townships in Douglas County, Illinois, USA.  As of the 2010 census, its population was 1,441 and it contained 613 housing units.

Geography

Cities, towns, villages
 Atwood (east side)
 Garrett

Unincorporated towns
 Chicken Bristle at 
 Ficklin at

Cemeteries
The township contains these four cemeteries: Lewis, Lower Lester, Taylor and Upper Lester.

Major highways
  U.S. Route 36

Airports and landing strips
 Bragg Landing Strip
 Cooch Landing Area
 Kamm Airport

Demographics

School districts
 Atwood-Hammond Community Unit School District 39
 Tuscola Community Unit School District 301

Political districts
 State House District 110
 State Senate District 55

References
 
 United States Census Bureau 2009 TIGER/Line Shapefiles
 United States National Atlas

External links
 City-Data.com
 Illinois State Archives
 Township Officials of Illinois

Townships in Douglas County, Illinois
Townships in Illinois